Mark Pember, also known as Meat Katie, is an English electronic musician. He creates music making hybrid sounds by combining several genres of music; tech-funk, techno, tribal, hip hop, breakbeat and house music. Several of his releases appeared on Kingsize Records during the late nineties and early 2000s. He currently owns, manages and records for the label LOT49 along with Dylan Rhymes. The label's artists include Dopamine, Kid Blue, Vandal, Odissi, Elite Force, and Lee Coombs. Meat Katie was awarded the Outstanding Contribution to Breakbeat award at the 2006 Breakspoll awards.

Discography 

Off the Bone (1998)
Long to Belong (2001)
Vibrator (2006)
Next Life (2016) - Lyrics & vocals by: Ithaka - Album: Back In The Day / Lowering The Tone Records [UK]

Compilations 

Destination Australia '02 (2003)
Bedrock Breaks (2004)
Beyond the Darkness (2002)
FabricLive.21 (2005)
Ministry Of Sound Presents Sessions: Vol. 8.1 (2008)

References

External links 
 Official Site

 Interview with Meat Katie

British DJs
British electronic musicians
Living people
Breakbeat musicians
Year of birth missing (living people)
Electronic dance music DJs